Rochharzela (born April 15, 1998), popularly known as Chhara is an Indian professional footballer who plays as a winger for Indian Super League club NorthEast United.

Club career

Aizawl FC 
Born in India, Rochharzela made his senior debut with I-League club Aizawl F.C., during the 2017–18 season.

In the 2019–20 season, Rochharzela was the top Aizawl Football Club goal scorer, scoring the greatest goal tally by an Indian during the season. He helped Aizawl come back to tie a game against Real Kashmir,⁣ who took a lead of 2–0 after Mason Robertson and Kallum Higginbotham scored. Rochharzela's goal helped the team finish the game with a final score of 2–2.

Rochharzela also plays for the club in the Mizoram Premier League and won Skynet Young Player Of The Year in Mizoram in the 2017–18 season.

NorthEast United 
In 2020, Rochharzela joined Indian Super League club NorthEast United on a three-year deal. Rochharzela scored 1 goal in 12 appearances in the 2020–21 Indian Super League season.

He played his first match of the 2021–22 Indian Super League season on 20 November 2021, as a substitute for V.P. Suhair in the 66th minute of the game which ended in a 2–4 loss. He scored a goal for NorthEast United on 4 December against FC Goa in their 2–1 win.

Career statistics

Club

References

1998 births
Living people
Footballers from Mizoram
Indian footballers
Association football midfielders
Aizawl FC players
NorthEast United FC players
I-League players
I-League 2nd Division players
Indian Super League players